Simon de Fierlant ( – 15 August 1686), Lord of Bodegem, was a jurist and holder of high office in the Spanish Netherlands.

Family 
De Fierlant was born in 's-Hertogenbosch around 1602, the son of Martin Fierlants, royal receiver of domains, and Catherine van Eyck. In 1629 his family fled 's-Hertogenbosch when it fell to the Dutch. On 10 December 1642 he married Anne-Marie de Reynegom (1625–1681), daughter of Thierry, lord of Eeklo, the Prince-Bishop of Liège's agent at the Brussels court, and Claire-Régine Mechelman, lady of Buzet. Together they had eight children. Two of their sons also held public office: Philippe-Ignace, lord of Bodeghem and Eeklo, became a member of the Sovereign Council of Brabant, and François-Simon, baron Fierlant, alderman of Brussels.

Career 
De Fierlant graduated Licentiate of Laws from Leuven University and on 18 August 1627 was called to the bar at the Council of Brabant. 

He was ennobled by letters patent of 16 April 1657, as lord of Heetvelde and Bodeghem, and on 25 April the same year was appointed councillor and master of requests of the Great Council of Mechelen, being sworn in on 4 May.  In 1663 he was appointed to the Supreme Council of Flanders in Madrid, returning to Brussels in 1668 as Chancellor of Brabant, a post he held for the next 18 years. He died in Brussels on 15 August 1686.

Works 
 Christianissimi regis in Brabantiae ducatum praetentio refutata (Cologne, 1667)
 Tractatus de imperio ac dignitatibus (Cologne, 1675)
 Austriacae domus ac gentis dilucidum jus in Burgundiae ducatum (Cologne,  1680)

References

Bibliography 

1600s births
1686 deaths
Chancellors of Brabant
Jurists of the Spanish Netherlands
Politicians from Brussels